Młynisko may refer to the following places:
Młynisko, Greater Poland Voivodeship (west-central Poland)
Młynisko, Łódź Voivodeship (central Poland)
Młynisko, Masovian Voivodeship (east-central Poland)
Młynisko, Pomeranian Voivodeship (north Poland)